The Piri System was part of the Sikh missionary administrative organization founded by the third Sikh guru, Guru Amar Das, for the purpose of propagating Sikhism amongst women. The system was significantly expanded by the seventh Sikh guru, Guru Har Rai. Each Piri was a Sikh missionary seat and administrative unit. A similar Manji system existed for the spread of Sikhism among men.

Meaning of Piri
A Piri is a very small wooden cot (taken as the seat of authority in this context) from which the Sikh Piris (female Sikh preachers, holders of seat of religious authority) would teach Sikhism to other women. The word Manji also means a wooden cot, similarly used to denote seat of Sikh religious authority for preaching Sikhism to men.

Founding of Piri system by Guru Amar Das
Guru Amar Das started the Piri and Manji systems by appointing 94 men as Manjis and 52 women as Piris for the spread of Sikhism.

Masand system
Sikh Gurus had established a Masand system of Sikh representatives who taught and spread the teachings of the Sikh Gurus and also collect monetary offering to maintain armed legion of saint-soldiers. Over time, this system became corrupted.

Expansion of Piri system by Guru Har Rai
Guru Har Rai Ji faced some serious difficulties during the period of his guruship. The corrupt Masands, Dhir Mal and Minas always tried to preclude the advancement of the Sikh religion.

Earlier, the Piri system was founded by Guru Amar Das. To reform the corrupted Masand system, Guru Har Rai expanded the Piri system by establishing additional female Sikh 'missionary' seats called Piris after the small cot (manji) used by the Guru's representatives. He also tried to improve the old corrupt Masand system and appointed pious and committed personalities, such as Suthre Shah, Sahiba, Sangtia, Mian Sahib, Bhagat Bhagwan, Bhagat Mal and Jeet Mal Bhagat (also known as Bairagi), as the heads of Manjis.

See also
Sikh Gurus

References

Gender and Sikhism
Sikh practices
Sikh terminology